Alandur taluk is a taluk of the district of Chennai in the Indian state of Tamil Nadu. The centre of the taluk is the neighbourhood of Alandur. The headquarters of the taluk is Guindy division. On 4 January 2018, Chennai district was expanded by annexing Alandur taluk.

Demographics
The 2011 census has the population of Alandur taluk had of 678927, 340848  males and 338079 females. There were 992 women for every 1000 men. The taluk had a literacy rate of 83.38. Child population in the age group below 6 was 33229 Males and 32456 Females.

References 

Taluks of Chennai district